Despard may refer to:

 Charlotte Despard, British suffragette and Sinn Féin activist
 Edward Marcus Despard, Irish-born British colonel turned revolutionary
 George Despard, character
 John Despard 1745–1829, British General
 Despard, West Virginia